The Man in the Silk Hat is a 1983 French documentary film about the films of the French silent film star Max Linder, directed by his daughter, Maud Linder. The film was screened out of competition at the 1983 Cannes Film Festival. A slightly longer version was presented in New York City in 1988, and released by Kino International.

Cast
 Max Linder (archive footage)
 Maud Linder as Narrator (voice)
 Sarah Bernhardt (archive footage)
 Benoit Constant Coquelin (archive footage)

References

External links

1983 films
1980s French-language films
French documentary films
Documentary films about actors
French black-and-white films
1983 documentary films
Documentary films about films
1980s French films